In cryptography, blinding is a technique by which an agent can provide a service to (i.e., compute a function for) a client in an encoded form without knowing either the real input or the real output.  Blinding techniques also have applications to preventing side-channel attacks on encryption devices.

More precisely, Alice has an input x and Oscar has a function f. Alice would like Oscar to compute  for her without revealing either x or y to him. The reason for her wanting this might be that she doesn't know the function f or that she does not have the resources to compute it.
Alice "blinds" the message by encoding it into some other input E(x);  the encoding E must be a bijection on the input space of f, ideally a random permutation. Oscar gives her f(E(x)), to which she applies a decoding D to obtain .

Not all functions allow for blind computation. At other times, blinding must be applied with care. An example of the latter is Rabin–Williams signatures. If blinding is applied to the formatted message but the random value does not honor Jacobi requirements on p and q, then it could lead to private key recovery. A demonstration of the recovery can be seen in  discovered by Evgeny Sidorov.

The most common application of blinding is the blind signature. In a blind signature protocol, the signer digitally signs a message without being able to learn its content.

The one-time pad (OTP) is an application of blinding to the secure communication problem, by its very nature. Alice would like to send a message to Bob secretly, however all of their communication can be read by Oscar. Therefore, Alice sends the message after blinding it with a secret key or OTP that she shares with Bob. Bob reverses the blinding after receiving the message. In this example, the function 
f is the identity and E and D are both typically the XOR operation.

Blinding can also be used to prevent certain side-channel attacks on asymmetric encryption schemes.  Side-channel attacks allow an adversary to recover information about the input to a cryptographic operation, by measuring something other than the algorithm's result, e.g., power consumption, computation time, or radio-frequency emanations by a device.  Typically these attacks depend on the attacker knowing the characteristics of the algorithm, as well as (some) inputs.  In this setting, blinding serves to alter the algorithm's input into some unpredictable state.  Depending on the characteristics of the blinding function, this can prevent some or all leakage of useful information.  Note that security depends also on the resistance of the blinding functions themselves to side-channel attacks.

For example, in RSA blinding involves computing the blinding operation , where r is a random integer between 1 and N and relatively prime to N (i.e. , x is the plaintext, e is the public RSA exponent and N is the RSA modulus.  As usual, the decryption function  is applied thus giving . Finally it is unblinded using the function . Multiplying  by  yields , as desired. When decrypting in this manner, an adversary who is able to measure time taken by this operation would not be able to make use of this information (by applying timing attacks RSA is known to be vulnerable to) as she does not know the constant r and hence has no knowledge of the real input fed to the RSA primitives.

Examples 
 Blinding in GPG 1.x

References

External links
 Timing Attacks on Implementations of Diffie-Hellman, RSA, DSS and Other Systems
 Breaking the Rabin-Williams digital signature system implementation in the Crypto++ library

Cryptography